Estadio Country Club is a  soccer-specific stadium located in the sector of  Country Club in San Juan, Puerto Rico. It is located approximately 13 miles southeast of Old San Juan.

The 2,000 seat stadium was designed specifically for soccer, but it has also been used for four professional boxing match programs, the latest of which took place in 1975. It is home to the Puerto Rico U-20 national football team and other various youth national teams.

The stadium was built to host the soccer matches at the 1979 Pan American Games.

References

Sports venues in San Juan, Puerto Rico
Football venues in Puerto Rico
Boxing venues in Puerto Rico